Melodifestivalen 2003 was the selection for the 43rd song to represent Sweden at the Eurovision Song Contest. It was the 42nd time that this system of picking a song had been used. Five heats had taken place to select the ten songs for the final, in Jönköping, Gothenburg, Luleå, Sundsvall and a Second Chance round in Stockholm. The final was broadcast on SVT1 and Sveriges Radio's P4 network. The show was watched by 1,230,751 people.

Schedule

Heats
The heats for Melodifestivalen 2003 began on 15 February 2003. Ten songs from these heats qualified for the final on March 15, 2003. This was the second year that a heat format had been used for the competition. "När löven faller" composed by Carola Häggkvist and Ingemar Åberg was disqualified prior to the competition.

Heat 1

Heat 2

Heat 3

Heat 4

Second Chance

Final

Voting

Juries

Televotes

Returning artists

See also
Eurovision Song Contest 2003
Sweden in the Eurovision Song Contest
Sweden in the Eurovision Song Contest 2003

External links
Melodifestivalen at SVT's open archive

2003 in Swedish music
2003 Swedish television seasons
2003
Eurovision Song Contest 2003
2003 song contests
February 2003 events in Europe
March 2003 events in Europe
Events in Stockholm
Events in Gothenburg
2000s in Stockholm
2000s in Gothenburg
Events in Luleå
Events in Sundsvall
Events in Jönköping